Jim Britt Grobe (born February 17, 1952) is an American football coach and former player who was most recently the defensive coordinator of the San Antonio Commanders of the Alliance of American Football. His previous position to that was as head football coach at Baylor University. From 2001 to 2013, Grobe served as the head football coach at Wake Forest University. In 2006, he was named ACC Coach of the Year by a unanimous vote and AP Coach of the Year for coaching Wake Forest to an 11–2 regular season and the Atlantic Coast Conference (ACC) title.

Playing career
Grobe earned his undergraduate degree (B.S.) in education from the University of Virginia in 1975 and earned a master's degree in guidance and counseling from Virginia in 1978. As a player at Virginia in 1973 and 1974, Grobe played middle guard (1973) and linebacker (1974). He was a two-year starter for the Virginia Cavaliers and was named Academic All-ACC.

Before enrolling at Virginia, Grobe spent two seasons with Ferrum College, then known as Ferrum Junior College, where he played linebacker on the undefeated Coastal Conference championship team. Grobe earned the Catlin Citizenship Award and the Big Green Award. In the fall of 2002, Grobe was inducted into the Ferrum College Hall of Fame.

Coaching career

Wake Forest

2006 season
In 2006, Grobe led Wake Forest to a school record 11 wins with a perfect 6–0 road record. His Wake Forest team also won the Atlantic Coast Conference championship by virtue of defeating Georgia Tech, 9–6, in the conference title game. The Demon Deacons earned their first trip to a BCS bowl game and played Louisville in the Orange Bowl. Grobe was named the ACC Coach of the Year, receiving 80 out of 80 votes from the league's media and making him the sixth Wake Forest coach to win the award. Grobe was also awarded the Bobby Dodd Coach of the Year Award and the AP Coach of the Year in 2006.

On February 27, 2007, Grobe signed a 10-year contract extension through 2016.

Resignation
Grobe resigned from Wake Forest on December 2, 2013.

Baylor
On May 30, 2016, Grobe was hired as Baylor's head coach for the 2016 season, coming out of semi-retirement. He made it known when he was brought on that he would not be a full time coach for the University, which had suspended and later terminated Art Briles due to the Baylor University sexual assault scandal. The Bears won their first six games before losing five in a row to close out the regular season. However, they Bears were invited to their seventh consecutive bowl game, the Motel 6 Cactus Bowl in Arizona. Baylor entered the game as heavy underdogs to the 10–2 Boise State Broncos, but the Bears rolled to an easy 31–12 victory. After the game, Grobe retired again.

San Antonio Commanders
In 2018, Grobe was named the defensive coordinator of the San Antonio Commanders.

Family
Grobe and his wife Holly have two sons, Matt and Ben, and four grandchildren. Matt has been head men's golf coach at Marshall University since 2012. Ben has formerly served as Assistant Director of Football Operations at the University of North Carolina at Charlotte.

Head coaching record

References

1952 births
Living people
Air Force Falcons football coaches
American football defensive linemen
American football linebackers
Baylor Bears football coaches
Coaches of American football from West Virginia
Emory and Henry Wasps football coaches
Ferrum Panthers football players
High school football coaches in Virginia
Marshall Thundering Herd football coaches
Ohio Bobcats football coaches
Players of American football from West Virginia
San Antonio Commanders coaches
Sportspeople from Huntington, West Virginia
Virginia Cavaliers football coaches
Virginia Cavaliers football players
Wake Forest Demon Deacons football coaches